Double-Time Records (a.k.a. Double-Time Jazz) is a jazz record company and label founded by Jamey D. Aebersold in New Albany, Indiana in 1995. Its catalogue includes albums by John Abercrombie, Bruce Barth, Jerry Bergonzi, Conrad Herwig, Andy LaVerne, Dave Liebman, Hank Marr, Steve Slagle, and Walt Weiskopf.

Discography

Albums

See also
List of record labels

References

External links
Discogs

Jazz record labels
American record labels